Eliza Burt Gamble (1841–1920) was an intellectual active in the 19th and early 20th centuries. She was an advocate of the Women's Movement, a mother, a writer, and a teacher from Michigan. Gamble's writings pioneered the use of evolutionary theory as a resource for making claims about women. Her work engaged with Charles Darwin's theory of sexual selection. Her work paid significant attention to the importance of gender in evolution.

Personal life
Gamble was born on June 4, 1841, in Concord, Michigan, to Luther Burt Jr. and Florinda Horton. On June 27, 1843 Luther died and on August 4, 1857, Florinda died. To earn a living Eliza began working as a schoolteacher in public schools in Concord, Michigan.  After five years teaching in district schools, Eliza rose to become the assistant superintendent of the East Saginaw high school. On January 4, 1865, she married James Gamble in Grand Rapids, Michigan. Eliza and James had three children, but only two of their children (William Burt and Helen Burt) were still living on June 22, 1900, when a census was taken.  William was born in January 1871 and Helen was born on November 1, 1872.  Eliza's daughter Kate died in infancy.

Eliza Gamble died at the Cadillac Hotel in Detroit on September 17, 1920.

Writings
Over the course of her career, Gamble wrote three books: The Evolution of Woman (1894), The God-Idea of the Ancients (1897), and The Sexes in Science and History (1916). In these works, Gamble sought to challenge male patriarchy using arguments grounded in religion, science, and history. In The Evolution of Woman and The Sexes in Science and History, Gamble employed close reading and theoretical argumentation about scientific texts to demonstrate women's superiority. The God-Idea of the Ancients, on the other hand, examined religious history to prove that women's position in society was the result of an aberrant historical process.

Bibliography

See also
 Antoinette Brown Blackwell
 Charles Darwin
 Charlotte Perkins Gilman

References

External links
 
 
 

1841 births
1920 deaths
American feminist writers
American women scientists
American women writers